The crimson-bellied woodpecker (Campephilus haematogaster) is a species of bird in subfamily Picinae of the woodpecker family Picidae. It is found in Bolivia, Colombia, Ecuador, Panama, and Peru.

Taxonomy and systematics

The crimson-bellied woodpecker was at one time placed in its own genus Cniparchus that was later merged into genus Phloeoceastes which was itself later merged into the currrent Campephilus. 

The South American Classification Committee of the American Ornithological Society (SACC), the International Ornithological Committee, and the Clements taxonomy assign two subspecies to the crimson-bellied woodpecker, the nominate C. h. haematogaster (Tschudi, 1844) and C. h. splendens (Hargitt, 1889). BirdLife International's Handbook of the Birds of the World (HBW) treats splendens as a full species, the splendid woodpecker. The SACC is seeking a proposal to accept the split.

This article follows the two-subspecies model.

Description

Both sexes of the nominate subspecies have a red forehead, crown, nape, and hindneck, a thin black line above the eye, a thin buff supercilium behind the eye, a wider black band from the nares through the eye to the red of the nape, and a black chin and throat. Males have a buff band between the black eye band and chin; on females the rear of the band extends down the side of the neck to the upper breast. Both sexes' scapulars and upper back are black to brownish black, their lower back and rump are deep red, and their uppertail coverts and tail are black. Their wings' upper surface is black with two white spots on most of the flight feathers. The wings' underside is blackish with pale bars. Their entire underparts from the bottom of the throat are red. Juveniles resemble adults but are duller and browner with a sooty forehead and less red on their underparts. Subspecies C. h. splendens differs from the nominate with a red lower throat to upper breast, three large buff spots instead of two white ones on the flight feathers, a wider and somewhat differently shaped buff band on the face, and rather mottled underparts.

Distribution and habitat

Subspecies C. h. splendens of the crimson-bellied woodpecker is the more northerly of the two. It is found in Panama along the whole Caribbean slope and from Panamá Province on the Pacific side and through western Colombia into western Ecuador. The nominate subspecies is found on the east slope of the Andes from Colombia south through Ecuador and Peru slightly into Bolivia. The species mostly inhabits the interior of humid and wet forest, montane forest, and várzea, though it also is found along the forest edge.

Behavior

Movement

The crimson-bellied woodpecker is a year-round resident throughout its range.

Feeding

The crimson-bellied woodpecker's diet is mostly adults and larvae of large beetles, though other insects are also taken. It usually forages near the ground on the trunks of large trees, by itself or in pairs, hammering and probing to reach the prey.

Breeding

The crimson-bellied woodpecker's breeding season appears to include March to May in Panama and September to April in Colombia and Ecuador. Nothing else is known about its breeding biology.

Vocal and non-vocal sounds

The crimson-bellied woodpecker's song is "a repetition of harsh, nasal, squeaky but loud eer notes". Its call is "a loud stk! st-kr-r-r-r-r-r-r". The nominate subspecies drums with "a fast drumroll of 3–4 loud raps" and C. h. splendens drums with "a rapid, heavy double rap".

Status

The IUCN follows HBW taxonomy and so has assessed the two subspecies of the crimson-bellied woodpecker separately. It has assessed the nominate "crimson-bellied" as being of Least Concern. It has a large range, but its population size is not known and is believed to be decreasing. No immediate threats have been identified. It has assessed the "splendid" C. h. splendens as Near Threatened. It too has a large range and an unknown population size that is believed to be decreasing. Clearance of mature forest for human habitation, farming, ranching, mining, and timber are the known threats, though no one of them predominates.

References

crimson-bellied woodpecker
Birds of the Colombian Andes
Birds of the Ecuadorian Andes
Birds of the Peruvian Andes
crimson-bellied woodpecker
Taxonomy articles created by Polbot